Badminton at the 1996 Summer Olympics included the four events (men's and women's singles, men's and women's doubles) as well as a new event:  mixed doubles.  An additional change to the tournament was the playoff game for the bronze medal rather than the awarding of two bronzes. The tournament was single-elimination.  Matches consisted of three sets, with sets being to 15 except. The tournament was held at the Georgia State University gymnasium.

Medalists

Medal table

Participating nations
A total of 37 nations participated in this event.

References

Sources
 
 
 

 
1996 Summer Olympics events
1996
Olympics
Badminton tournaments in the United States